Epiney is a surname. Notable people with the surname include:

Astrid Epiney (born 1965), German-Swiss jurist
Sébastien Epiney (born 1967), Swiss ski mountaineer and long-distance runner
Sven Epiney (born 1972), Swiss television host TV-moderator, radio moderator, and editor